Enrique Claramunt Torres (born 12 July 1948) is a Spanish former footballer who played as a forward.

Club career
Born in Puçol, Valencian Community, Claramunt emerged through local club Valencia CF's youth system. He made his senior debut with the reserves in the 1968–69 season, being relegated from Segunda División.

Claramunt was promoted to the Mestalla Stadium's main squad for 1970–71, his first appearance in La Liga occurring on 12 September 1970 in a 0–2 away loss against Real Madrid. He scored his first goal in the competition on 13 December in a 2–1 home win over CE Sabadell FC, and added a further four during the campaign to help his team win the fourth national championship in their history.

After leaving the Che in 1974, Claramunt continued to compete in his native region until his retirement, representing CD Castellón in the second tier and amateurs Villarreal CF.

Personal life
Claramunt's older brother, José, was also a footballer. He too represented Valencia and they shared teams during four seasons, being thus known as Claramunt I and Claramunt II.

Honours
Valencia
La Liga: 1970–71

References

External links

CiberChe biography and stats 

1948 births
Living people
People from Puçol
Sportspeople from the Province of Valencia
Spanish footballers
Footballers from the Valencian Community
Association football forwards
La Liga players
Segunda División players
Tercera División players
Atlético Saguntino players
Valencia CF Mestalla footballers
Valencia CF players
CD Castellón footballers
Villarreal CF players